Ricardo Azevedo (born August 24, 1956) is a Brazilian professional water polo coach.

Biography
Born in Brazil, Azevedo played on the Brazilian National Water Polo Team from 1974 to 1980. He was twice voted Brazil's "Player of the Year". In 1976, his team won the gold medal in the South American Games. Azevedo received his Bachelor of Arts degree from California State University, Long Beach in 1980.

After his playing career, Azevedo became a water polo coach and is now considered one the premier coaches in the world.  Azevedo was Head Coach for the USA Men's Water Polo Team, USA Junior Team, and at Long Beach State University.  Azevedo became head coach of RN ElettroGreen Camogli in 2007, unexpectedly leading his young team  to the division Championship title game in 2008.  Azevedo is unique among the global water polo community due to his language skills that have observed his coaching international teams in English, Spanish, Italian, Portuguese, and Japanese.

Azevedo has coached several Olympians since their youth including his son Tony Azevedo who was a four-time All American and NCAA Player of the Year at Stanford University and serves as Captain of the Men's Water Polo Team for the 2008 Summer Olympics and 2012 Summer Olympics, and his daughter Cassie who was a two-time All-American water polo player at Long Beach State. For the 2012 Summer Olympics, Azevedo is the head coach of the Chinese Men's Water Polo National team. He was later moved to coach the Chinese Women's National Water Polo Team, leading them for the 2016 Rio Olympics. However, after a lackluster showing at the Olympics where China finished in second-last place, he was sacked.

Personal life
Ricardo Azevedo is the father of Tony Azevedo, athlete and captain of the US national team, and Cassie, also a water polo player.

Notes
Azevedo met his wife Libby when he was an exchange student at Long Beach.

References

External links
 
Many Articles Written by Ricardo Azevedo

1956 births
Living people
Water polo players from Rio de Janeiro (city)
Brazilian male water polo players
Brazilian water polo coaches
United States men's national water polo team coaches
China women's national water polo team coaches
Water polo coaches at the 2016 Summer Olympics
Brazil men's national water polo team coaches
California State University, Long Beach alumni